Chas  is a panchayat village in the state of Maharashtra, India, on the left (east) bank of the Bhima River.  Administratively, Chas is under Khed Taluka of Pune District in Maharashtra. There is only the single village of Chas in the Chas gram panchayat.   The village of Chas is 16 km southeast of the Chas-Kaman Dam, and 14 km by road northwest of the town of Rajgurunagar (Khed).

Demographics   
In the 2001 census, the village of Chas in Khed Taluka had 2,480 inhabitants, with 1,260 males (50.8%) and 1,220 females (49.2%), for a gender ratio of 968 females per thousand males.

Notes

External links 
 
 

Villages in Pune district